Kladruby nad Labem is a municipality and village in Pardubice District in the Pardubice Region of the Czech Republic. It has about 600 inhabitants. It is known as the home of the Kladruber horse breed. The village with the surrounding landscape is a UNESCO World Heritage Site.

Administrative parts
Villages of Bílé Vchynice, Kolesa and Komárov are administrative parts of Kladruby nad Labem.

Geography
It lies in the East Elbe Table, in the Polabí region. The river Elbe forms the southern municipal border. The Strašovský Stream flows through the municipality.

History

Kladruby nad Labem was first mentioned in 1295 as the property of the Premonstratensian monastery at Litomyšl. During the second half of the 14th century, it came into the possession of the Cistercian Sedlec Abbey near Kutná Hora. In 1500, the village was acquired by Vilém II of Pernštejn, who already owned large parts of the Pardubice region. Kladruby remained in possession of the Pernštejn family until 1560, when it was purchased by Emperor Ferdinand I from his master of the horse, Jaroslav of Pernštejn.

In 1579, Emperor Rudolf II established the Imperial Stud at Kladruby, from which Spanish-blood horses were bred for ceremonial purposes.

Following the fall of the Austro-Hungarian monarchy in 1918, the stud farm at Kladruby came under state administration.

Sights

On 6 July 2019, the Landscape for Breeding and Training of Ceremonial Carriage Horses at Kladruby nad Labem was inscribed as a UNESCO World Heritage Site. The site includes the villages of Kladruby nad Labem and Selmice, the Imperial Stud Farm, and the surrounding farmsteads, gardens, pastures, and watercourses. The landscape was uniquely designed in the 16th and 17th centuries to effectively breed and train the Kladruber horses. In addition, the area demonstrates an outstanding example of the ferme ornée style of landscape architecture made popular in the 18th century.

Notable people
Gottlieb Polak (1883–1942), horse rider

References

External links

Landscape for Breeding and Training of Ceremonial Carriage Horses at Kladruby nad Labem

Villages in Pardubice District
World Heritage Sites in the Czech Republic